Nagpur Central Assembly constituency is one of the 288 Vidhan Sabha (legislative assembly) constituencies of Maharashtra state, western India. It is one of the six assembly seats which make up  Nagpur Lok Sabha seat. The Constituency Number is 55. This constituency is located in the Nagpur district. The delimitation of the constituency happened in 2008. It comprises parts of Nagpur Taluka, and Ward No. 66, 92 to 98, 109 to 119 and 121 to 129.  of Nagpur Municipal Corporation.

List of Members of Legislative Assembly

Election Results

1999 Elections
 Anees Ahmed  (INC) :  39445
 Vikas Shankarrao Kumbhare (BJP)  :  31189

2004 Elections
 Anees Ahmed  (INC) : 39684
 Dayashankar Chandrashekhar (BJP)  :  28401

2009 Elections
 Vikas Shankarrao Kumbhare (BJP)  :  56312 
 Dr. Ramchandra  (INC)  :  45521
 Haji Gani Khan  (BSP)  :  24034

2014 Elections
 Vikas Shankarrao Kumbhare (BJP)  :  87523 
 Anees Ahmed  (INC)  :  49452

2019 Elections
Source:
 Vikas Shankarrao Kumbhare (BJP)  :  75692
 Bunty Baba Shelke (INC)  :  71684  
 Abdul Sharique Patel (AIMIM)  :  8565 
 NOTA : 2149  
 Dharmendra Mandlik (BSP) : 1971

References

Assembly constituencies of Nagpur district
Politics of Nagpur
Assembly constituencies of Maharashtra